Events from the year 1834 in Scotland.

Incumbents

Law officers 
 Lord Advocate – Francis Jeffrey until May; then John Murray until November; then Sir William Rae, Bt
 Solicitor General for Scotland – Henry Cockburn; then Andrew Skene; then Duncan McNeill

Judiciary 
 Lord President of the Court of Session – Lord Granton
 Lord Justice General – The Duke of Montrose
 Lord Justice Clerk – Lord Boyle

Events 
 May – Dean Bridge in Edinburgh opened to horse and cart traffic.
 29 July – a steam carriage designed by John Scott Russell on the Glasgow–Paisley road overturns and suffers a boiler explosion causing the death of four passengers.
 11 September – emigrant ship Sybelle out of Cromarty wrecked off St. Paul Island (Nova Scotia) with the loss of all 316 passengers and all but six of her crew.
 9 October – first shipment of tea direct from India arrives at the Broomielaw quay in Glasgow.
 26 December – Ursulines of Jesus take up residence at St Margaret’s Convent in the Whitehouse in Edinburgh, the first Roman Catholic convent established in Scotland since the Reformation; it will be another 5 years before the first such modern establishment in England.
 Naval architect John Scott Russell first observes a nondecaying solitary wave (a soliton, which he calls "the Wave of Translation") while watching a boat hauled through the water of the Union Canal near Edinburgh, subsequently using a tank to study the dependence of solitary wave velocities on amplitude and liquid depth.
 Thomas Henderson is appointed first Astronomer Royal for Scotland.
 Edinburgh Geological Society is established.
 Princess Royal Maternity Hospital is established as the Glasgow Lying-in Hospital and Dispensary.
 Annan Bridge built by Robert Stevenson.
 Moffat Academy is established by merger of the local grammar and parish schools.
 Charles Randolph establishes the millwrighting business of Randolph & Elliott in the Tradeston district of Glasgow, predecessor of the Fairfield Shipbuilding and Engineering Company.
 The McGeoch family establish a pawnbrokers in Paisley, predecessor of the chain store M&Co. (Mackays).
 The Second (New) Statistical Account of Scotland begins publication under the auspices of the General Assembly of the Church of Scotland.
 The Evangelical Thomas Chalmers becomes chairman of the General Assembly's church extension committee.
 The Royal and Ancient Golf Club of St Andrews gains its royal patronage.

Births 
 27 January – Alexander Asher, politician and Solicitor General for Scotland (died 1905)
 16 March – James Hector, geologist (died 1907 in New Zealand)
 5 April – Robert Rowand Anderson, architect (died 1921)
 12 April – William Hope, soldier, recipient of the Victorian Cross (died 1909 in London)
 27 April – Margaret Macpherson Grant, heiress and philanthropist (died 1877)
 4 July – Christopher Dresser, designer influential in the Anglo-Japanese style (died 1904 in England)
 22 August – George Kynoch, businessman (died 1891 in South Africa)
 17 September – Robert Simpson, retail merchant (died 1897 in Canada)
 1 October – Mary Mackellar, née Cameron, Gaelic poet and translator (died 1890)
 12 October – Mark MacTaggart-Stewart, né Stewart, politician (died 1923)
 23 November – James Thomson ("B.V."), poet (died 1882 in London)
 Probable date – Peter Dodds McCormick, schoolteacher, composer of the Australian national anthem (died 1916 in Australia)

Deaths 
 26 March – Jean Armour, widow of Robert Burns (born 1765)
 9 June – John Henry Wishart, surgeon (born 1781)
 12 July – David Douglas, botanist (born 1799; died in Hawaii)
 2 September – Thomas Telford, civil engineer (born 1757; died in London)
 16 September – William Blackwood, publisher and writer (born 1776)
 21 September – Robert Edmonstone, painter (born 1794)
 24 November – John Gillies, botanist (born 1792)
 5 December – Thomas Pringle, writer, poet and abolitionist (born 1789; died in London)
 7 December – Edward Irving, founder of the Catholic Apostolic Church (born 1792)
 Anne Forbes, portrait painter (born 1745)
 Probable date – Sarah Bezra Nicol, actress (born in England)

See also 

 1834 in the United Kingdom

References 

 
Scotland
1830s in Scotland